Thomas Goodwin (1600–1680) was an English Puritan theologian.

Thomas Goodwin may also refer to:

Government and politics
Thomas Goodwin (Australian politician) (1848–1921), New South Wales politician
Thomas Goodwin (MP) (died 1566), MP for Poole and Lyme Regis (UK Parliament constituency)
John Goodwin (British Army officer) (Thomas Herbert John Chapman Goodwin, 1871–1960), Governor of Queensland
Tom Goodwin (New Jersey politician) (born ), state senator

Other people
Tom Goodwin (born 1968), American professional baseball coach and former player
Thomas Goodwin (Archdeacon of Derby) (–1719), English Anglican priest
Tommy Goodwin (footballer) (born 1979), English footballer
Thomas C. Goodwin, documentary filmmaker, producer of Educating Peter

See also
Thomas Goodwin Hatchard, bishop of Mauritius
Thomas Godwin (disambiguation)